Several brands of motorcycles have been colloquially referred to as Cleveland motorcycles:

The 'Cleveland' motorcycle brand of the American Cycle Manufacturing Company of Hartford, Connecticut (1902–1905). After receivership in 1907, merged with the American Bicycle Company to form Pope Manufacturing Company.
Cleveland motorcycles, using Precision engines, made by Cleveland Motors, Douglas Street, Middlesbrough (includes the former Cleveland), England, (1911–1914) ridden by Freddie Dixon.
The Cleveland Motorcycle Manufacturing Company of Cleveland, Ohio (1915–1929).
 The Cleveland Motorcycle Manufacturing Company, of Cleveland, Ohio, a low-volume custom chopper builder (Since 1986).
 Cleveland CycleWerks of Cleveland, Ohio, manufacturer of offshore-produced small displacement motorcycles (Since 2009).

See also
 Cleveland (disambiguation)
 Cleveland Motor Company, car maker  (1904–1909).